Steven Kenneth Thompson (June 24, 1965 – February 15, 2016) was an American football defensive tackle in the National Football League for the Washington Redskins.  He played college football at the University of Minnesota.

References

1965 births
2016 deaths
Sportspeople from Aurora, Illinois
American football defensive tackles
Minnesota Golden Gophers football players
Washington Redskins players